Liberia: An Uncivil War, (also as Liveria: O pio skliros emfylios), is a 2004 American-Liberian documentary TV Movie co-directed Jonathan Stack and James Martin Brabazon.  The film was co-produced by both directors: James Brabazon and Jonathan Stack for Gabriel Films. The documentary revolves around the American interference for 2003 summer in Liberia where a power struggle between the rebel movement Liberians United for Reconciliation and Democracy (LURD) and government leader Charles Taylor. Due to the war, hundreds of innocent civilians die from mortar shells.

The film stars Zubin Cooper himself and Liberian president Charles Taylor. The film also included the video footage of American president George W. Bush. The film had its premier on 7 August 2004 in the United States of America. Then, the film was screened on 5 April 2005	at Thessaloniki Documentary Festival, Greece, on 23 April 2005 at Independent Film Festival of Boston, USA and then on 29 April 2005 at One World Film Festival, Czech Republic.

Plot

Cast
 George W. Bush (archive footage)
 Zubin Cooper
 Charles Taylor, Liberian President

References

External links
 
 Liberia: An Uncivil War on YouTube

2004 films
American documentary films
Liberian documentary films
English-language Liberian films
2004 documentary films
2000s English-language films
2000s American films